Juan Martínez Munuera (born 13 July 1982) is a Spanish football referee who officiates in La Liga. He has been a FIFA referee since 2015, and is ranked as a UEFA second category referee.

Refereeing career
Munuera began officiating in the Segunda División B in 2006, the Segunda División in 2010 and La Liga in 2013. In 2011, he refereed a match in the 2011–12 Swiss Challenge League between Stade Nyonnais and Winterthur. He officiated his first La Liga match on 17 August 2013 between Real Sociedad and Getafe.

He was put on the FIFA referees list in 2015. On 2 July of the same year, he officiated his first UEFA club competition match, a meeting between Estonian club Sillamäe Kalev and Croatian club Hajduk Split in the 2015–16 UEFA Europa League first qualifying round. He was selected as an additional assistant referee for the 2017 UEFA European Under-21 Championship in Poland.

Munuera's first senior international match as referee was on 9 May 2018, an international friendly between Saudi Arabia and Algeria. Also in 2018, he was chosen as a referee for the 2018 UEFA European Under-19 Championship in Finland, where he officiated three matches including the final between Italy and Portugal. The following year, he served as a video assistant referee at both the 2019 FIFA U-20 World Cup in Poland and the 2019 FIFA Club World Cup in Qatar, including the final of the latter between English side Liverpool and Brazilian side Flamengo. He also worked as the assistant VAR in the final match of the 2019 UEFA Nations League Finals between Portugal and the Netherlands.

On 17 April 2021, Munuera officiated the 2021 Copa del Rey Final between Athletic Bilbao and Barcelona. On 21 April, he was selected as a video assistant referee for UEFA Euro 2020, to be held across Europe in June and July 2021.

References

External links
 
 
 Juan Martínez Munuera at EU-Football.info

1982 births
Living people
People from Benidorm
Sportspeople from the Province of Alicante
Spanish football referees